Girls Mountain is a  glaciated mountain summit located in the Chugach Mountains, in the U.S. state of Alaska. Precipitation runoff from the mountain and meltwater from its glaciers drains into tributaries of the Tsina River, which in turn is part of the Copper River drainage basin.

History

The Girls Mountain name was officially adopted in 1964, by the U.S. Board on Geographic Names after being named in 1963 by Austin Post of the United States Geological Survey. The name was suggested by the International Geophysical Year benchmark, "Station Girls, 1957", cemented into the mountain's bedrock summit. The first ascent of the peak was made in 1957 by Austin Post and USGS party who placed the benchmark.

Climate

Based on the Köppen climate classification, Girls Mountain has a polar climate with long, cold, snowy winters, and cool summers. Temperatures can drop below −20 °C with wind chill factors below −30 °C. This climate supports the Tsina and Worthington Glaciers surrounding the mountain. The months May through June offer the most favorable weather for viewing and climbing.

See also

List of mountain peaks of Alaska
Geography of Alaska

References

External links
 Weather forecast: Girls Mountain
 Flickr photo: Girls Mountain upper right
 Flickr photo: Girls Mountain right of center

Mountains of Alaska
Landforms of Chugach Census Area, Alaska
North American 1000 m summits